Novhorod-Siverskyi Raion  is a raion (district) of Chernihiv Oblast, northern Ukraine. Its administrative centre is located at Novhorod-Siverskyi. Population: 

On 18 July 2020, as part of the administrative reform of Ukraine, the number of raions of Chernihiv Oblast was reduced to five, and the area of Novhorod-Siverskyi Raion was significantly expanded. Two abolished raions, Korop and Semenivka Raions, as well as the city of Novhorod-Siverskyi, which was previously incorporated as a city of oblast significance and did not belong to the raion, were merged into Novhorod-Siverskyi Raion. The January 2020 estimate of the raion population was

Subdivisions

Current
After the reform in July 2020, the raion consisted of 4 hromadas:
 Korop settlement hromada with the administration in the urban-type settlement of Korop, transferred from Korop Raion;
 Novhorod-Siverskyi urban hromada with the administration in the city of Novhorod-Siverskyi, retained from Novhorod-Siverskyi Raion and Novhorod-Siverskyi Municipality.
 Ponornytsia settlement hromada with the administration in the urban-type settlement of Ponornytsia, transferred from Korop Raion;
 Semenivka urban hromada with the administration in the city of Semenivka, transferred from Semenivka Raion.

Before 2020

At the time of disestablishment, the raion consisted of one hromada, Novhorod-Siverskyi urban hromada with the administration in Novhorod-Siverskyi. The hromada also included Novhorod-Siverskyi Municipality.

References

Raions of Chernihiv Oblast
1923 establishments in Ukraine